Foresman is an unincorporated community in Iroquois Township, Newton County, in the U.S. state of Indiana.

History
Foresman was laid out as a town in 1882 by John B. Foresman, and named for him. A post office was established at Foresman in 1883, and remained in operation until it was discontinued in 1934.

Geography

References

Unincorporated communities in Newton County, Indiana
Unincorporated communities in Indiana